The city of Iconium in Lycaonia has been a Christian bishopric since the 1st century under the Ecumenical Patriarchate of Constantinople. In 1662, a Roman Catholic titular archbishopric (Archidioecesis Iconiensis) was established, although the area had never actually been Catholic in profession.

List of titular bishops

Joannes Mattaeus Caryophyllis (8 Aug 1622 Appointed - 23 May 1633) 
Giulio Caracciolo, (24 Aug 1671 - ) 
Camillo Paolucci (26 Jun 1724 Appointed - 18 Apr 1746) 
Matteo Trigona (1 Apr 1748 Appointed - 29 Jun 1754) 
Agatino Maria Reggio Statella (17 Feb 1755 - 6 Feb 1764) 
Giovanni Battista Caprara Montecuccoli (1 Dec 1766 Appointed - 21 Feb 1794) 
Antonio Maria Odescalchi (1 Jun 1795 - 28 May 1804) 
Pietro Caprano (8 Mar 1816 - 21 May 1829) 
Jean-Baptiste Auvergne  (29 Mar 1833 - 7 Sep 1836) 
Niccola Candoni (28 Feb 1837 - 15 Nov 1838) 
Johannes von Geissel (23 May 1842 - 19 Oct 1845) 
Vincenzo Annovazzi (21 Sep 1846 - 4 Aug 1850 ) 
Antonio Ligi-Bussi, (17 Feb 1851 - 9 Sep 1862) 
Luigi Puecher Passavalli, (17 May 1867 - 4 Oct 1897) 
Raffaele Sirolli (14 Dec 1899 - 20 Apr 1903 Died) 
Luigi Lazzareschi (22 Jun 1903 - 23 Jan 1918 Died) 
Pietro di Maria (11 Jun 1918 - 3 Sep 1937) 
Eugène-Gabriel-Gervais-Laurent Tisserant (25 Jun 1937 Appointed - 18 Feb 1946) 
Luca Ermenegildo Pasetto,  (22 Sep 1937 Appointed - 11 Nov 1950) 
Sergio Pignedoli (22 Dec 1950 - 5 Mar 1973)

References

Sources
 (for Chronology of Bishops)
 (for Chronology of Bishops)
 Pius Bonifacius Gams, Series episcoporum Ecclesiae Catholicae, Leipzig 1931, p. 451

Catholic titular sees in Asia
Dioceses established in the 17th century
Culture in Konya